Lieutenant-Colonel Dudley Jaffray Hynman Allenby, 2nd Viscount Allenby (8 January 1903 – 17 July 1984), was a British peer and soldier.

Background and education
The son of Captain Frederick Claude Hynman Allenby and Edith Mabel (née Jaffray) Allenby, he succeeded his uncle as 2nd Viscount Allenby on the latter's death on 14 May 1936. He attended Eton, and the Royal Military College, Sandhurst.

Career
Allenby joined the 11th Hussars in 1923, served in India, 1923–26, after which he served as an Adjutant in the 11th Hussars, 1926–30.  He was an instructor at the Royal Military College, Sandhurst, from 1930 to 1934. He attained the rank of captain in 1936, served in Egypt, 1934–37. He served as an adjutant in the Army Fighting Vehicles School, 1937–40; he became a major, 1938. He was second in command of the Royal Gloucestershire Hussars, 1940–42, and a lieutenant-colonel of the 2nd Derbyshire Yeomanry from 1942. He retired in 1946.

Family
Lord Allenby married firstly, Gertrude Mary Lethbridge Champneys (d.1988), daughter of Edward Geoffrey Stanley Champneys, on 10 July 1930. They had one son:
Michael Allenby, 3rd Viscount Allenby (1931–2014)

The couple were divorced in 1949. Allenby married secondly, Daisy Hancox (d. 1985), daughter of Charles Francis Hancox, on 13 April 1949.

Arms

References

External links

1903 births
1984 deaths
Viscounts in the Peerage of the United Kingdom
British Army personnel of World War II
Graduates of the Royal Military College, Sandhurst
People educated at Eton College
11th Hussars officers
Royal Gloucestershire Hussars officers
Derbyshire Yeomanry officers
Viscount Allenby